Hemidactylus varadgirii, commonly known as Giri's brookiish gecko or Amboli brookiish gecko is a species of gecko. It is endemic to India.

References

Hemidactylus
Reptiles described in 2019
Endemic fauna of India
Reptiles of India